Daisy Hernández Gaytán (born 6 January 1983) is a Mexican politician affiliated with the Party of the Democratic Revolution. As of 2014 she served as Deputy of the LX Legislature of the Mexican Congress representing Oaxaca.

References

1983 births
Living people
Politicians from Oaxaca
Women members of the Chamber of Deputies (Mexico)
Party of the Democratic Revolution politicians
21st-century Mexican politicians
21st-century Mexican women politicians
Deputies of the LX Legislature of Mexico
Members of the Chamber of Deputies (Mexico) for Oaxaca